Luis Eladio Pérez is a Colombian politician. He served as a member of the Senate of Colombia. He was held captive by the FARC for seven years (from 2001 to 2008), four of which were spent alongside Ingrid Betancourt.

See also
List of kidnappings

Works

References

Colombian people taken hostage
Kidnapped politicians
Living people
Members of the Senate of Colombia
Year of birth missing (living people)